This article is about the particular significance of the year 1922 to Wales and its people.

Incumbents

Archbishop of Wales – Alfred George Edwards, Bishop of St Asaph

Archdruid of the National Eisteddfod of Wales – Dyfed

Lord Lieutenant of Anglesey – Sir Richard Henry Williams-Bulkeley, 12th Baronet  
Lord Lieutenant of Brecknockshire – Joseph Bailey, 2nd Baron Glanusk
Lord Lieutenant of Caernarvonshire – John Ernest Greaves
Lord Lieutenant of Cardiganshire – Herbert Davies-Evans
Lord Lieutenant of Carmarthenshire – John Hinds
Lord Lieutenant of Denbighshire – Lloyd Tyrell-Kenyon, 4th Baron Kenyon    
Lord Lieutenant of Flintshire – Henry Gladstone, later Baron Gladstone 
Lord Lieutenant of Glamorgan – Robert Windsor-Clive, 1st Earl of Plymouth
Lord Lieutenant of Merionethshire – Sir Osmond Williams, 1st Baronet
Lord Lieutenant of Monmouthshire – Ivor Herbert, 1st Baron Treowen
Lord Lieutenant of Montgomeryshire – Sir Herbert Williams-Wynn, 7th Baronet 
Lord Lieutenant of Pembrokeshire – John Philipps, 1st Viscount St Davids 
Lord Lieutenant of Radnorshire – Arthur Walsh, 3rd Baron Ormathwaite (until 20 January); Charles Coltman-Rogers (from 20 January)

Events
1 January - The Rhondda and Swansea Bay Railway is incorporated into the Great Western Railway.
25 January - A letter written by Ifan ab Owen Edwards to the children's periodical Cymru'r Plant results in establishment of the Welsh youth organisation Urdd Gobaith Cymru.
February - The last fighting ship completes fitting out and commissioning at Pembroke Dock, Royal Navy light cruiser HMS Capetown.
26 April - The last ship is launched from Pembroke Dock, Royal Fleet Auxiliary tanker Oleander.
18 October - In a by-election at Newport, caused by the death of Liberal MP Lewis Haslam, Reginald Clarry wins the seat for the Conservatives.
22 October - David Lloyd George is replaced by Bonar Law as Prime Minister of the United Kingdom, after the Conservatives leave the Coalition Government.
23 December - Cargo ship Maid of Delos sinks in St George's Channel off Skomer with all 26 crew killed.

Arts and literature
Wilfred Mitford Davies sets up the first Welsh children's book publisher, Cymru'r Plant.
The Gregynog Press is established by the sisters Margaret and Gwendoline Davies (granddaughters of Victorian industrialist David Davies) of Gregynog Hall.
The University of Wales Press is established.

Awards
National Eisteddfod of Wales (held in Ammanford)
National Eisteddfod of Wales: Chair - J. Lloyd-Jones, "Y Gaeaf"
National Eisteddfod of Wales: Crown - Robert Beynon, "Y Tannau Coll"

New books

English language
Henry Jones - A Faith that Enquires
Arthur Machen - The Secret Glory

Welsh language
D. Ambrose Jones - 
J. Glyn Davies

Music
10 October - Contralto Leila Megane makes the first recording of Sir Edward Elgar's Sea Pictures, with Elgar himself conducting.
Walford Davies is knighted for his services to music.

Film
The Last King of Wales, starring Charles Ashton
Lyn Harding makes an early screen appearance in When Knighthood Was in Flower.
Ivor Novello stars in The Bohemian Girl

Broadcasting

Sport
Rugby union - Wales wins the Five Nations championship.
Football (soccer)
Cardiff City FC win the Welsh Cup
Porth F.C. win the Welsh Football League, but are suspended from the SWMFA for failing to pay their debts.
Garden Village Football Club is formed.

Births
2 January – D. Geraint James, physician (d. 2010)
15 January – Emlyn Davies, rugby international (d. 2016)
16 February – Sir Geraint Evans, opera singer (d. 1992)
14 March – Colin Fletcher, pioneering backpacker and writer (d. 2007)
24 March – Arthur "Waring" Bowen, solicitor and charity worker
16 April
(in London) Kingsley Amis, novelist associated with Swansea (d. 1995)
Rees Stephens, Welsh international rugby union captain (d. 1998)
21 April – Allan Watkins, England Test cricketer (d. 2011)
7 May
Gwyn Hughes, footballer (d. 1999)
Monica Jones, lecturer in English literature, a lover of Philip Larkin (d. 2001)
11 June – Tom Cole, Welsh-American racing driver (d. 1953)
26 June – William Griffiths, hockey player (d. 2010)
4 July (in the United States) – Phyllis Kinney, expert on Welsh folk music
18 July 
Ray Cale, dual code international rugby player (d. 2006)
Ray Lambert, footballer (d. 2009)
20 July – Ruth Bidgood (née Jones), poet (d. 2022)
10 August – Bert Evans, Welsh-American footballer (d. 2008)
12 September – Arthur Daniels, rugby league player (d. 2001)
3 October – Hugh James, aviator (d. 2015)
31 October – Talfryn Thomas, comedy actor (d. 1982)
18 December – Maldwyn Jones, historian (d. 2007)
22 December – Eryl Davies, teacher and school inspector (d. 1982)
date unknown
Thomas Nathaniel Davies, painter (d. 1996)
Denis Griffiths, tenor (d. 2001)

Deaths
29 January – George Owen, footballer, 56
4 February – Sir Henry Jones, philosopher, 69
25 February – Mary Jane Evans, teacher, preacher and actress, 34
9 April – Constance Jones, English-born philosopher and educator, 74 
22 April – W. Llewelyn Williams, lawyer and historian, 55
3 May – Dick Kedzlie, Wales international rugby player, 59
14 May – William Abraham ("Mabon"), politician, 79
16 May – Thomas Powel, Celtic scholar, 76/77
2 June – Sir John David Rees, politician, 67
20 June – John Williams, politician, 60
8 July – James Bevan Edwards, army officer and politician, 86
6 August – Thomas Pryce-Jenkins, Wales international rugby player, 60
12 August – Arthur Griffith, Irish-born nationalist politician of Welsh descent, 50
22 August – John Bryn Edwards, ironmaster, 33
12 September – George Rowles,  Wales international rugby player, 56
28 September – Charlie Newman, Wales rugby union captain, 65
21 December – William Morris (Rhosynnog), Baptist minister, 79
25 December – Percy Jones, former world boxing champion, 29
27 December – Thomas William Rhys Davids, Pali scholar, 79

See also
 1922 in Northern Ireland

References